"Have You Ever Really Loved a Woman?" is a song written by Canadian musician Bryan Adams, Michael Kamen and Robert John "Mutt" Lange, and recorded by Adams for the 1995 film Don Juan DeMarco, starring Marlon Brando, Johnny Depp and Faye Dunaway. The melody is used as a musical motif through the film, and the song is featured three times in the movie, twice performed by other artists in Spanish, and finally performed by Adams himself during the closing credits. The Adams version of the song, which features flamenco guitarist Paco de Lucia, is featured on the soundtrack album and also on the album 18 til I Die, which was released over a year later.

The song stayed at number one for five weeks on the Billboard Hot 100 in the United States, making it the third number-one song for the songwriting team. It also went to number one in Canada, Australia, Austria, and Switzerland while reaching the top five in 10 additional countries, including France and the United Kingdom, and the top ten in a further four countries. The song was nominated for Best Original Song at the 68th Academy Awards but lost to "Colors of the Wind" from Pocahontas.

Critical reception
Paul Verna from Billboard described the song as "sultry". Steve Baltin from Cash Box noted that here, "the king of soundtrack ballads attempts to reclaim his throne". He added further, "The flamenco introduction lends the false hope this may be something different, but it's the same old Adams. Be careful not to operate any heavy machinery while under the influence of this one." Fell and Rufer from the Gavin Report viewed it as an "unusual waltz with #1 written all over it." Pan-European magazine Music & Media commented, "Everything is there to make it work: a film, Don Juan De Marco, a ballad, a long song title but nothing between brackets, guitarist Paco De Lucia and Adams' hoarse voice." Christine Coulter, librarian/programmer at Downtown Radio/Belfast stated, "It's absolutely different from his previous film ballads. The film, which will be issued here in May I believe, is not the reason we play it. For us it's a track that stands fully on its own." A reviewer from Music Week gave it three out of five, writing that "Bryan comes over all Hispanic for this strong ballad which arrives replete with Spanish guitar flourishes and castanets." The magazine's Alan Jones described it as "a simple, singalong song in waltztime, with acoustic Spanish style guitar picking."

Music video
The accompanying music video for "Have You Ever Really Loved a Woman?" was shot in Spain at Casa los Pavos Reales, Málaga starring Cecilie Thomsen and Amira Casar. It was directed by the music video director Anton Corbijn and was released in May 1995.

Track listing
 CD single
 "Have You Ever Really Loved a Woman?" – 4:52
 "Low Life" – 4:17

Charts

Weekly charts

Year-end charts

Decade-end charts

Certifications

Release history

References

1990s ballads
1995 singles
1995 songs
A&M Records singles
Billboard Hot 100 number-one singles
Bryan Adams songs
European Hot 100 Singles number-one singles
Music videos directed by Anton Corbijn
Music videos shot in Spain
Number-one singles in Australia
Number-one singles in Austria
Number-one singles in Switzerland
RPM Top Singles number-one singles
Song recordings produced by Robert John "Mutt" Lange
Songs written by Bryan Adams
Songs written by Michael Kamen
Songs written by Robert John "Mutt" Lange
Works based on the Don Juan legend